Rhodopteriana insignifica is a moth in the  family Eupterotidae. It was described by Rothschild in 1917. It is found in the Democratic Republic of Congo.

References

Janinae
Moths described in 1917
Endemic fauna of the Democratic Republic of the Congo